Iridomyrmex spurcus is a species of ant in the genus Iridomyrmex. Described by William Morton Wheeler in 1915, the ant has a large extensive distribution in Australia.

References

Iridomyrmex
Hymenoptera of Australia
Insects described in 1915